Irving Torgoff (March 6, 1917 – October 21, 1993) was an American professional basketball player.

Early life
Torgoff was born in Brooklyn, New York, and played basketball at Tilden High School.

Education
He attended Long Island University from 1935 to 1939 and was a two-time All-American for coach Clair Bee. In 1939, Torgoff led LIU to an undefeated record and a National Invitation Tournament championship over Loyola University Chicago. At the end of the season, he was named the winner of the Haggerty Award as the top collegiate player in the New York City area.

Career
After graduating, Torgoff played professional basketball with the Detroit Eagles of the National Basketball League, the Philadelphia Sphas of the American Basketball League, and the Washington Capitols, Baltimore Bullets, and Philadelphia Warriors of the Basketball Association of America.

Red Auerbach, who coached the Capitols before gaining fame as coach of the Boston Celtics, said of Torgoff, "He was really the first player who became known as a sixth man in basketball. Torgoff was the kind of player who could come off the bench and was as good as any of the starters. He could turn a whole game around. He was one of the great players."

After his basketball career ended, Torgoff sold fabrics and yarn. He died of a heart attack in Fort Lauderdale, Florida, in 1993.

BAA career statistics

Regular season

Playoffs

References

External links

1917 births
1993 deaths
All-American college men's basketball players
Baltimore Bullets (1944–1954) players
Basketball players from New York City
Detroit Eagles players
Jewish men's basketball players
LIU Brooklyn Blackbirds men's basketball players
Philadelphia Sphas players
Philadelphia Warriors players
Sportspeople from Brooklyn
Washington Capitols players
Samuel J. Tilden High School alumni
American men's basketball players
Forwards (basketball)
20th-century American Jews